BP2 may refer to:

Bipolar II disorder (BP-II)
South View LRT station (BP2), Singapore
BPD, also known as BP2, a Mazda B engine
BP2 combination problem, a Binding problem in neuroscience, cognitive science and philosophy of mind
BASIC Plus 2 programming language

See also
The Blueprint 2: The Gift & The Curse, a 2002 album by Jay-Z
Black Panther: Wakanda Forever, also known as Black Panther 2